Hossein Ali Khan-Sardar was an Iranian football player from the early 20th century. He was a goalkeeper during his playing career. He was born in Tehran, Iran.

Playing career

Club career 
He played his club football in Belgium whilst studying. In 1919 he returned to Iran from Belgium but his stay was short, as in 1920 he left for Switzerland and joined Servette Geneva where he played professional football. Upon his return from Europe he played for Toofan FC a club based in Tehran.

National career 
Although Hossein-Ali Khan Sardar never played for the Iranian national team as it didn't get created until 1941, he was the captain of Tehran XI team that traveled to Baku, USSR in 1926 and also in 1929 when Tehran was host to Baku XI.

However, he has one cap to his name appearing in goal for Switzerland national football team as a substitute for the injured Swiss goalkeeper in a game against France national football team.

International caps

Managerial career 

He managed Toofan FC one of Iran's most popular football clubs during the 1940s.

References 

Iranian expatriate footballers
Iranian footballers
Switzerland international footballers
Swiss men's footballers
Sportspeople from Tehran
Servette FC players
Year of birth missing
Year of death missing
Association football goalkeepers
Iranian expatriate sportspeople in Switzerland
Expatriate footballers in Switzerland